Begonia is the stage name of Alexa Dirks, a Canadian pop singer-songwriter from Winnipeg, Manitoba. She is most noted for her 2019 album Fear, which was longlisted for the 2020 Polaris Music Prize and shortlisted for the Juno Award for Adult Alternative Album of the Year at the Juno Awards of 2021.

Formerly a member of the Juno Award winning band Chic Gamine, Dirks launched her solo career in 2017 with the EP Lady in Mind. The EP's single "Juniper" reached #1 on the Radio 2 Top 20.

The single "Hanging on a Line" was released in June 2019 as a preview of Fear. She undertook a Canadian tour over the summer, before releasing Fear in September.

References

Canadian women singer-songwriters
Canadian singer-songwriters
Canadian pop singers
Canadian women singers
Canadian Mennonites
Mennonite musicians
Musicians from Winnipeg
Living people
Year of birth missing (living people)